"Sense" is the eighth single by Japanese rock band Band-Maid, released in Japan on October 27, 2021, by Pony Canyon. The song was used as the opening theme song for the anime Platinum End.

Composition and lyrics
They were approached to write "Sense" on New Year's Day 2021 and recorded it before summer. The lyrics are about the manga Platinum End. They were given free range with the lyrics, except that they had to include the words "angel" and "premonition". The orchestral intro was not originally part of the song, lead guitarist Kanami Tōno composed it after the producers of the anime asked them to include it.

"Hibana" was used in the Japanese e-sports competition game Rainbow Six Siege, which the lyrics are based on.

"Corallium" is  lead vocalist Saiki Atsumi's first lyrical composition. Rhythm guitarist/vocalist Miku Kobato also wrote lyrics for the song, but Atsumi's lyrics were chosen instead. The song is about the ocean, which she is afraid of. She stated that she thinks the ocean is similar to love. Atsumi asked Tōno to write a song similar to "Alone" or "Choose Me".

Background and release
The single was released in three versions: a limited edition which contains the CD, a Blu-ray of six songs recorded at an online concert on May 10, 2021, a second limited edition which contains the CD and a DVD of the aforementioned concert, and a standard edition which only contains the CD. "Sense" and "Corallium" appeared on their EP Unleash.

Critical reception
Raijin Rock called it the best single/EP of the year and said that the songs are "...frenetic, furious, hypnotic, insane, manic." JRock News said of the title track "Every part of it packs punches and you’re left without a second of rest." JaME said that "...none of the three songs on this energy bomb of a single would sound out of place on the January release." Trent Cannon of Rice Digital said that the title track is "...every bit as dramatic and soaring as the best metal bands".

Music video
The music video for "Sense" was released on October 27, 2021, directed by Ryoji Aoki.

Track listing
CD

Blu-ray/DVD

Credits and personnel
Credits adapted from the "Sense" single liner notes.

Band-Maid members
 Misa – bass
 Miku Kobato – vocals, guitar
 Saiki Atsumi – vocals
 Akane Hirose – drums
 Kanami Tōno – guitar

Recording and management
 Sound producer: Band-Maid
 Recording Engineer: Masyoshi Yamamoto
 Mix Engineer: Masahiko Fukui
 Mastered: Masahiko Fukui
 Cover design: Saiki Atsumi
 Jacket illustration: The Butler
 Art direction: Masashi Nakazato (Number Inc.)
 Design: Yuta Sekiguchi (Number Inc.)

Charts

Release history

References

External links
 Discography – Band-Maid official website

2021 singles
Anime songs
Band-Maid songs
Japanese-language songs
Pony Canyon singles